Smoking Gun Interactive Inc. (SGI) is a Canadian video game developer based in Vancouver. It is known for developing medieval MMO tower defense game Age of Empires: Castle Siege, which is published by Microsoft Studios.

Smoking Gun was founded in 2007 by John Johnson, Drew Dunlop and Angie Pytlewski, former developers from Relic Entertainment, who produced the Company of Heroes series. In September 2022, the company agreed to be acquired by Keywords Studios.

References

External links
 

2022 mergers and acquisitions
Canadian subsidiaries of foreign companies
Companies based in Vancouver
Keywords Studios
Video game companies established in 2007
Video game companies of Canada
Video game development companies